Thomas C. Simpson was an American businessman, jurist, and politician from Newburyport, Massachusetts.

Political career
In 1883, Simpson represented the 16th Essex District in the Massachusetts House of Representatives.

In 1885 he served as the Mayor of Newburyport.

On June 28, 1890, President Benjamin Harrison nominated Simpson for the position of Collector of Customs the Newburyport District. He held this position until 1892.

Legal career
In 1877, Simpson was admitted to the bar.

On May 23, 1900, he was appointed judge of the Newburyport Police Court.

Business career
In 1884, Simpson and David L. Withington purchased the Plumb Island Bridge and a small hotel on the island. They sold the property three years later.

In 1886, Simpson and seven others founded the Newburyport Street Sprinkling Association, which watered properties on a few streets in the city. The association was dissolved the following year after the city of Newburyport took over responsibility for watering the streets.

Altamonte Springs
In 1882, Simpson and a group of Massachusetts businessmen formed the Altamonte Land, Hotel and Navigation Company. The company began purchasing land in the area of Lakes Orienta, Adelaide, and Florida and in 1883 opened the Altamonte Hotel. The area became known as Altamonte Springs, Florida. One of the streets in the new community was named Newburyport Street after the hometown of Simpson and many other of the company's investors.

References

19th-century American politicians
Collectors of the Port of Newburyport
Massachusetts lawyers
Mayors of Newburyport, Massachusetts
Republican Party members of the Massachusetts House of Representatives
Year of birth missing
Year of death missing